Loma Prieta (from Spanish loma -hill, prieta -dark) is  high and is the highest peak in the Santa Cruz Mountains in Northern California.

Although the 1989 Loma Prieta earthquake was named for this mountain, the actual epicenter was five miles southwest of the peak, across the San Andreas fault, in The Forest of Nisene Marks State Park. 

In the 19th century, the peak was called Mount Bache, a name given in honor of Alexander Dallas Bache; the name is no longer in use.

From 1955 to 2005, the mountain was the longtime site for the transmitter tower of San Jose television station KNTV.

Geology 
Loma Prieta is the tallest peak in the Santa Cruz Mountains and it is common to see snow on the mountain during the winter.  

Loma Prieta and other nearby mountain peaks are pushed upward by local collision forces associated with a left bend in the San Andreas fault.  Starting near Uvas Canyon, the fault stops trending northwest but instead bends west-northwest for about eight miles before continuing its northwest direction.  This left bend is renowned among geologists as a archetypal restraining bend which acts to oppose strike-slip motion along the fault. From the perspective of Loma Prieta and other mountains atop the Sierra Azul block, the Pacific Plate is trying to shear them off the North American Plate but can't break them off.  Rather, the resulting transpression force pushes up the local terrain and helps explain why these are the highest peaks in the Santa Cruz Mountains.

Astronomy 
From 1976 through 1990 amateur astronomer Donald Machholz set up his telescope an average of 120 times a year on the south slope of this mountain to search for comets.  From this site he discovered three new comets that bear his name, including Periodic Comet Machholz 1 96P/Machholz on May 12, 1986.

The first official West Coast Messier marathon was conducted from this site in March 1979.

See also 
 List of summits of the San Francisco Bay Area

References

External links 
 

Mountains of Santa Clara County, California
Mountains of the San Francisco Bay Area
Santa Cruz Mountains
Mountains of Northern California